Witch Hunt is a 1999 Australian crime drama, directed by Scott Hartford-Davis and written by NCIS: Los Angeles creator, Shane Brennan. It premiered on Australia's Network Ten on 2 May 1999.

Plot
A young girl goes missing and her father (Daddo) accuses his mother-in-law, Barbara (Bisset) of abducting her. He speculates about Barbara's deep involvement in the occult with the accusation that she is a witch. Barbara responds by accusing her son-in-law of abusing her granddaughter.

Cast
 Jacqueline Bisset as Barbara Thomas
 Cameron Daddo as David Overton
 Jerome Ehlers as Detective Jack Maitland

References

External links
 

1999 television films
1999 films
Australian television films
Films shot in Australia
Films about witchcraft